Cyclophora impudens is a moth in the  family Geometridae. It is found on the Galapagos Islands.

References

Moths described in 1904
Cyclophora (moth)
Moths of South America